Ellen K. Levy is an American multimedia artist and scholar known for exploring art, science and technology interrelationships since the early 1980s.  Levy works to highlight their importance through exhibitions, educational programs, publications and curatorial opportunities; often through collaborations with scientists including NASA, some in conjunction with Leonardo, the International Society for the Arts, Sciences and Technology.  She is a past president of the College Art Association and has published widely on art and complex systems.

Education 
She earned her doctorate from the University of Plymouth in 2012 on the study of art and the neuroscience of attention, and received her diploma in painting from the School of the Museum of Fine Arts in Boston, following a BA from Mount Holyoke College in Zoology.

Career 
Levy, "whose fascination with technology is not only tinged by skepticism but also rivaled by an interest in the acts of God that are sometimes visited on grand technological schemes -- witness the Challenger," was one of the early artists commissioned by the NASA Art Program, in 1985.   Her early career focused on painting and exhibitions at then alternative science spaces such as the New York Academy of Sciences in 1984, NASA; and the National Academy of Sciences, and is also in their collection. She has had numerous solo exhibitions in the United States and abroad, including at Associated American Artists and Michael Steinberg Fine Arts in New York City. Shared Premises: Innovation and Adaptation was exhibited at the National Technical Museum in Prague.  Her work was also included in the Second Moscow Biennale of Contemporary Art exhibit, Petroliana (Oil Patriotism).

Her talks and exhibitions explore attention, perception, and genetics, including human error and inattention blindness in Stealing Attention; in exhibitions involving the environment such as Weather Report and Climate Change, (2004) curated by Lucy Lippard, and Face Off (2004), curated by Ronald Feldman; and a two-person exhibition based on data from the magazine Skeptical Inquirer; and in her New York Public Library site-specific exhibition Meme Machines, using mixed media to visualize cultural evolution and ways of creating and transmitting knowledge, which was also the subject of an Art Talk interview with novelist Siri Hustvedt.

Former chair of Leonardo/ISAST's LEAF (Leonardo Education and Art Forum) initiative, Levy co-directs, with Patricia Olynyk, the New York City-based Leonardo Art and Science Evening Rendezvous (LASER), part of Leonardo/ISAST's international program of evening gatherings that brings artists and scientists together for informal presentations and conversations.  A twice invited participant to The Watermill Center's Art & Consciousness Workshop, she was President of the College Art Association from 2004 to 2006, Special Advisor on the Arts and Sciences at the Institute for Doctoral Studies in the Visual Arts(IDSVA) from 2012 to 2017, and a Distinguished Visiting Fellow in Arts and Sciences at Skidmore College in 1999, a position funded by the Henry Luce Foundation, and named one of the 66 Brilliant Women in Creative Technology.

Levy has published in many books and journals including Leonardo/ISAST's journal Leonardo. In 1996 she was guest editor of Art Journal's Contemporary Art and the Genetic Code, the first widely distributed, in-depth academic publication about contemporary artistic responses to genetics, genomics, which included articles by Stephen J. Gould, Roald Hoffmann, Robert Root-Bernstein, Martin Kemp, and Dorothy Nelkin, and was cited in Cambridge University Press's Science in Context, Writing Modern Art and Science – An Overview.  Her article Contemporary Art and the Genetic Code: New Models and Methods of Representation, was cited in Stephen Wilson's 2003's Information Arts, Intersections of Art, Science, and Technology, an introduction to the work and ideas of "a who's who of international scenemakers," artists who use and influence science and technology; and in 2016, with her essay Art Enters the Biotechnology Debate: Questions of Ethics, was listed in Oxford University Press's authoritative guide to the current scholarship on Science and Contemporary Art. Barbara Larson and Ellen Levy are co-editors of the Science and the Arts Since 1750 six title book series published by Routledge.

Selected bibliography 
 D'Arcy Wentworth Thompson's Generative Influences in Art, Design, and Architecture From Forces to Forms, Eds. Ellen K. Levy, Charissa N. Terranova; Bloomsbury Visual Arts, London; March 2021, 
 Book Series: Science and the Arts since 1750, Eds., Barbara Larson, Ellen K. Levy; 2017 - 2021, Routledge Press, US and UK.
 "Enraptured: Attention and Art," Perception and Agency in Shared Spaces of Contemporary Art, Eds., C.Albu and D. Schuld; 171-183, 2017, Routledge Press, US and UK.
  "Classifying Kubler: Between the Complexity of Science and Art," Im Maschenwerk der Kunstgeschichte, Eds., S. Maupeu, K. Schankweiler, S. Stallschus; 225-245, Kulturverlag Kadmos, Berlin, 2014.
 "Sleuthing the Mind," Leonardo, 47 ( 5), 427-435, 2014 doi:10.1162/LEON a 00864
 "Contemporary Art and the Aesthetics of Natural Selection," Darwin and Theories of Aesthetics and Cultural History, Eds., Barbara Larson and Sabine Flach, Aldershot, UK: Ashgate Press, 145-165, 2013
 "Neuroscience and the Arts Today," in PAJ, 35 (3), 8-23, 2013, doi:10.1162/PAJJ-a-00157
 "Bioart and Nanoart in a Museum Context: Terms of Engagement," Ed., J. Marstine; The Routledge Companion to Museum Ethics: Redefining Ethics for the Twenty-First Century Museum, 445-464, 2011, Routledge Press, US and UK.
 "Defining Life: Artists Challenge Conventional Classifications," Eds., M. Lovejoy, C. Paul, V. Vesna; Context Providers, 275-299, 2011, Intellect Press, Bristol and University of Chicago Press, Chicago, 
 "Cultural Evolution," Ed., Leonardo Journal, 43 (5), 420, 2010, doi:10.1162/LEON e 00032
  "Art Enters the Biotechnology Debate: Questions of Ethics," Eds.,  G. Levin, E. King; Ethics and the Visual Arts, Ch. 16, 199-216, Allworth Press, New York, 2006, 
 "Complexity" with Philip Galanter and Manuel A. Báez, Leonardo, volume 36, issue 4, pp. 259–267, 2003 doi:10.1162/002409403322258583
 "The Genome and Art: Finding Potential in Unknown Places," Leonardo, 34 (2), 2014, 172-175. 2001, doi:10.1162/002409401750184762
 "Contemporary Art and the Genetic Code," Art Journal, Levy, E., Ed. with Sichel, B.,  55 (1) Spring Issue 1996, College Art Association, New York, doi:10.1080/00043249.1996.10791734
 "Monkey in the Middle: PreDarwinian Evolutionary Thought and Artistic Creation," Perspectives in Biology and Medicine, Levy, E., Levy, D., & Goldberg, M (1986),  3 (1): 95-106, 1986. doi:10.1353/pbm.1986.0092

References 

Living people
Artists from New York (state)
American contemporary artists
New media artists
American women artists
American art curators
American women curators
American artists
Alumni of the University of Plymouth
School of the Museum of Fine Arts at Tufts alumni
Mount Holyoke College alumni
Year of birth missing (living people)
21st-century American women